Mahabadi (related either to Mahabad or Mahabad county in West Azerbaijan Province, Iran, or to a variety of homonymous small settlements across the Islamic Republic of Iran) is a Persian language surname which is also to be found among the Iranian diaspora. Notable people with the surname include:

 Davoud Mahabadi (born 1973), Iranian football manager and former player
 Hadi-Khan Mahabadi (born 19??), Iranian-Canadian businessman and Order of Canada winner
 Mohsen Fakhrizadeh-Mahabadi (1958-2020), Iranian physicist

References 

Persian-language surnames